Roger Theder (September 22, 1939 – October 1, 2016) was an American football player and coach.  He served as the head football coach at  the University of California, Berkeley from 1978 to 1981, compiling an on-field record of 17–28.  Theder was later an assistant coach for the Baltimore Colts and the San Diego Chargers of the National Football League (NFL). Theder was an alumnus of Western Michigan University, where he played college football as a quarterback and joined Phi Kappa Tau fraternity. Theder died on October 1, 2016, from Parkinson's disease at the age of 77.

Head coaching record

College

References

Place of birth missing
1939 births
2016 deaths
American football quarterbacks
Baltimore Colts coaches
Bowling Green Falcons football coaches
California Golden Bears football coaches
Northern Illinois Huskies football coaches
Stanford Cardinal football coaches
San Diego Chargers coaches
San Jose State Spartans football coaches
United States Football League coaches
Western Michigan Broncos football players
High school football coaches in Ohio
Deaths from Parkinson's disease

Neurological disease deaths in California
Western Michigan Broncos baseball players